Vyacheslav Bezukladnikov (7 September 1968 – 10 July 2001) was a Russian ice hockey player. He competed in the men's tournament at the 1994 Winter Olympics.

Career statistics

Regular season and playoffs

International

References

1968 births
2001 deaths
Soviet ice hockey players
Olympic ice hockey players of Russia
Ice hockey players at the 1994 Winter Olympics
Ice hockey players who died while playing
Sportspeople from Yekaterinburg
HC Lada Togliatti players